Tarache arida is a moth in the family Noctuidae (owlet moths) described by Smith in 1900. It is found in North America.

The MONA or Hodges number for Tarache arida is 9150.

References

Further reading
 
Lafontaine, J. Donald, & Schmidt, B. Christian (2010). "Annotated check list of the Noctuoidea (Insecta, Lepidoptera) of North America north of Mexico". ZooKeys, vol. 40, 1-239.

External links
Butterflies and Moths of North America

Acontiinae
Moths described in 1900